Taipidon octolamellata was a species of air-breathing land snail, a terrestrial pulmonate gastropod mollusk in the family Charopidae. This species was endemic to French Polynesia; it is now extinct.

References

O
Extinct gastropods
Extinct animals of Oceania
Fauna of French Polynesia
Molluscs of Oceania
Gastropods described in 1887
Taxonomy articles created by Polbot